Williams Middleton (1809–1883) was a son of South Carolina Governor Henry Middleton (1770–1846). He is best known as a signer of the South Carolina Ordinance of Secession, and as one of the owners of Middleton Place, National Historic Landmark gardens outside Charleston, SC. Williams and his two brothers John Izard Middleton and Admiral Edward Middleton were the trustees of their Father's entire estate. Williams inherited Middleton Place in 1846 and he pursued the family's interest in rice culture, carried out agricultural experiments, and further enhanced the gardens with the introduction of azaleas. In addition to Middleton Place, Williams Middleton made his home in town at 1 Meeting St., a house he owned between 1855 and 1870.

In 1860 Williams and an older brother signed South Carolina's Ordinance of Secession that removed the state from the Union, leading to the Civil War. Only days after the fall of Charleston in 1865, a detachment of Union soldiers from New York occupied Middleton Place. On February 22, 1865, the main house and flanking buildings were ransacked and burned. At the close of the war, with financial help from his sister, Eliza Middleton Fisher of Philadelphia, and with a small income from phosphate mining, timber and lumber sales, Williams managed to hold on to the family plantation. He was able to repair the South Flanker sufficiently to make it the post-Civil War family home.

Williams Middleton and his wife, Susan Pringle Smith, had two children, Elizabeth (Lilly, 1849–1915) and Henry (Hal, 1851–1932). Williams died in 1883. In 1886, an earthquake leveled what remained of the Main House and the North Flanker, while the restored South Flanker survived.

References

1809 births
1883 deaths
American people of Barbadian descent
American people of English descent
Middleton family